"Youth Without Youth" is a song by Canadian indie rock band Metric. It was released as the lead single from their 2012 album, Synthetica. The song debuted at number 1 on the Canadian alternative rock chart and stayed at that spot for a record 16 consecutive weeks. The song tackles the subject of a fraying social state through the eyes of a deprived youth.

Reception
The song has received mixed to favorable reviews from critics. Jon Dolan of Rolling Stone gave the song a mixed review, giving it a rating of 3 out of 5 stars and describing the song as "Glam sugar with a bitter core". Dolan further stated that "Perennial indie crush Emily Haines drops a wasted-youth anthem with scarred poetry like "We played blindman's bluff till they stopped the game," over a bleak- bubblegum stomp."

Jillian Mapes of Billboard praised Haines' songwriting, stating "Lyrically, frontwoman Emily Haines toys with powerful imagery, using phrases like "double dutch with a hand grenade" and "rubber soul with a razor blade" to describe a young life full of malaise and even criminality."

Charts

Weekly charts

Year-end charts

Certifications

References

2012 singles
2012 songs
Metric (band) songs
Song recordings produced by Gavin Brown (musician)
Songs written by Gavin Brown (musician)